Frank Morris Perry (28 March 1925 – 19 September 2021) was a British actor, best known for his roles on television.

Perry was born in Bromley, Kent, England. His TV credits include City Beneath the Sea, The Avengers, Z-Cars, Champion House, The Champions, The Persuaders!, Doctor Who (in the serial Colony in Space), Doomwatch, Special Branch, The Sweeney, Survivors, The Professionals, Secret Army, Reilly, Ace of Spies, The Bill, Midsomer Murders and Not Going Out. His film credits include Nothing But the Night (1973), One Hour to Zero (1976), Sweeney! (1977), The Human Factor (1979), Silver Dream Racer (1980), The Bunker (1981) and Crush (2001). In 2004 he appeared in the BAFTA award-winning short film Letters of Service.

In 1953, Perry wed British actress Margaret Ashcroft, and they remained married until her death in 2016. They had four children.

Perry died on 19 September 2021, at the age of 96.

Filmography

References

External links
 

1925 births
2021 deaths
20th-century English male actors
21st-century English male actors
English male film actors
English male television actors
Male actors from Kent
People from Bromley